Zoey 101 is an American comedy drama television series created by Dan Schneider for Nickelodeon. It aired from January 9, 2005, to May 2, 2008. A total of 61 episodes were aired, spanning four seasons.

Series overview

Episodes

Season 1 (2005)

Season 2 (2005–06)

Season 3 (2006–08)

Season 4 (2008)

References

External links
 TV Guide's Zoey 101 episode guide
 Tv.com's Zoey 101 Episode Guide

Episode list using the default LineColor
Lists of American children's television series episodes
Zoey 101
Lists of American sitcom episodes
Lists of Nickelodeon television series episodes